Nemanja Tošić (born 1 April 1986) is a Serbian football striker.

References

External links
 
 Nemanja Tošić stats at utakmica.rs 
 

1988 births
Living people
Footballers from Belgrade
Association football forwards
Serbian footballers
FK BSK Borča players
FK Dorćol players
FK BASK players
FK Jedinstvo Užice players
FK Donji Srem players
Serbian SuperLiga players